Anderson-Shiro Consolidated Independent School District (ASCISD) is a public school district based in Anderson, Texas (USA). In addition to Anderson, the district also serves the community of Shiro as well as rural areas in central Grimes County. The district operates a combined junior/senior high school, Anderson-Shiro Jr./Sr. High School, and one elementary school, Anderson-Shiro Elementary School.

Finances
As of the 2010-2011 school year, the appraised valuation of property in the district was $449,666,000. The maintenance tax rate was $0.104 and the bond tax rate was $0.039 per $100 of appraised valuation.

Academic achievement
In 2011, the school district was rated "recognized" by the Texas Education Agency.  Thirty-five percent of districts in Texas in 2011 received the same rating. No state accountability ratings will be given to districts in 2012. A school district in Texas can receive one of four possible rankings from the Texas Education Agency: Exemplary (the highest possible ranking), Recognized, Academically Acceptable, and Academically Unacceptable (the lowest possible ranking).

Historical district TEA accountability ratings
2011: Recognized
2010: Exemplary
2009: Recognized
2008: Academically Acceptable
2007: Academically Acceptable
2006: Academically Acceptable
2005: Academically Acceptable
2004: Recognized

Schools
In the 2011-2012 school year, the district had students in two schools. 
Anderson-Shiro Jr./Sr. High School (Grades 6-12)
Anderson-Shiro Elementary (Grades PK-5)

Athletics
Anderson-Shiro High School participates in the following sports:
Boys—Football, Basketball, and Cross-Country for fall sports; Baseball, Golf, Tennis, and Track for spring sports.
Girls—Basketball, Volleyball and Cross-Country for fall sports; Softball, Golf, Tennis, and Track for spring sports.

The 2006 boys baseball team won the 1A state championship.

See also

List of school districts in Texas
List of high schools in Texas

References

External links
Anderson-Shiro CISD

School districts in Grimes County, Texas
School districts established in 1970